Lee Jong-Hyun (born 8 January 1987) is a South Korean football midfielder who currently plays for Gimhae City FC. He has previously played for K-League clubs Gyeongnam FC and Incheon United.

Club career
Lee joined Gyeongnam FC for the 2010 season, but never played for the club at senior level.  Moving to Incheon United FC the following season, his professional debut was in an away match against Sangju Sangmu Phoenix on 5 March 2011 in which he played 15 minutes as a late substitute.

Generally spending the majority of the 2011 K-League matches as an unused substitute, Lee has seen more matchplay in the group games of the 2011 K-League Cup, including a start in the 1 - 0 loss to his former club Gyeongnam FC.

In June 2012, Lee joined Korea National League side Gimhae City FC.

Club career statistics

References

External links
 
 

1987 births
Association football midfielders
South Korean footballers
Gyeongnam FC players
Incheon United FC players
K League 1 players
Living people